Spring Hill High School may refer to the following educational institutions:

 Spring Hill High School (Arkansas), Spring Hill, Arkansas
 Spring Hill High School (South Carolina), Chapin, South Carolina
 Spring Hill High School (Tennessee), Columbia, Tennessee
 Spring Hill High School (Texas), Longview, Texas

See also
 Springhill High School (disambiguation)